The Irresistible Lover is a lost 1927 American silent comedy film directed by William Beaudine.

Cast
 Norman Kerry as J. Harrison Gray
 Lois Moran as Betty Kennedy
 Gertrude Astor as Dolly Carleton
 Lee Moran as Lawyer
 Myrtle Stedman as Hortense Brown
 Phillips Smalley as Mr. Brown
 Arthur Lake as Jack Kennedy
 Walter James as Mr. Kennedy
 George C. Pearce as Smith (as George Pearce)

See also
Gertrude Astor filmography

References

External links
 
 

1927 films
1927 comedy films
Universal Pictures films
Lost American films
Silent American comedy films
American silent feature films
American black-and-white films
Films directed by William Beaudine
1927 lost films
Lost comedy films
1920s American films